Francis Alexander MacKinnon, The 35th MacKinnon of MacKinnon  DL (9 April 1848 – 27 February 1947) was the longest-lived Test cricketer until being surpassed by Eric Tindill of New Zealand on 8 November 2009. MacKinnon, who was 98 years, 324 days old when he died, was the oldest-ever first-class cricketer at that time.

MacKinnon was born at Acryse Park, near Folkestone in Kent, and was educated at Harrow School. An amateur cricketer, he joined the MCC in 1870, and played first-class cricket from 1870 to 1885.

He attended St John's College, Cambridge, graduating in 1871.  He played cricket for Cambridge University, winning his blue in 1870.  He played in the famous University match in 1870, known as Cobden's Match, in which Cambridge's Frank Cobden conceded only one run and took three wickets in the last four-ball over to win the match by two runs.

MacKinnon played for Kent County Cricket Club from 1875. He toured Australia with Lord Harris in 1878–79, and played his only Test on this tour, making 0 and 5 in his two innings, bowled by Fred Spofforth twice. His first dismissal was the second in the first Test hat-trick. He was President of Kent in 1889.

In 1888, MacKinnon married the Hon. Emily Hood. They had one son and one daughter. His wife died in 1934.

He was a captain in the Royal East Kent Yeomanry from 1871 to 1893, promoted to honorary major in 1886 and resigned, but was re-appointed captain on 14 March 1900. He was a justice of the peace and Deputy Lieutenant for Kent from 1900 to 1902. On the death of his father in 1903, he became The MacKinnon of Mackinnon, the 35th Chief of the Mackinnon Clan.

He died at his home, Drumduan, in Forres in Morayshire, Scotland.

References

External links

1848 births
1947 deaths
Alumni of St John's College, Cambridge
Cambridge University cricketers
Francis
Deputy Lieutenants of Kent
England Test cricketers
English people of Scottish descent
Kent cricketers
People educated at Harrow School
Scottish clan chiefs
Gentlemen of Kent cricketers
English cricketers